Samantha Hamill (born 23 February 1991) is an Australian competitive swimmer.  She competed in the 200-metre butterfly and the 400-metre individual medley at the 2008 Summer Olympics in Beijing, and the 200-metre butterfly at the 2012 Summer Olympics in London.

References

External links 
 
 
 

1991 births
Living people
Australian female butterfly swimmers
Australian female medley swimmers
Olympic swimmers of Australia
Swimmers at the 2008 Summer Olympics
Swimmers at the 2012 Summer Olympics
Commonwealth Games medallists in swimming
Commonwealth Games silver medallists for Australia
Swimmers at the 2010 Commonwealth Games
21st-century Australian women
Medallists at the 2010 Commonwealth Games